J&R Kosher Meat and Delicatessen is a Montreal kosher butcher and delicatessen established in 1952 by Robert Nemes, a Holocaust survivor and immigrant from Romania. It is currently at 5800 Cavendish Blvd in the heart of the city's Jewish community. J&R is the oldest and one of the most famous remaining kosher meat shops in Montreal. The store delivers its meat throughout Quebec and Ontario, and ships throughout the rest of Canada.

History
Shortly after immigrating to Canada from Romania, Nemes worked in a meat packing house during the day and at Schwartz's at night. He used his savings and a $400 loan to launch the business. As the company expanded, his son Sidney joined the business.

In 1978, to conform to Quebec's Bill 101, the store changed its name to Boucherie et Charcuterie Kascher J&R.

In 1991, J&R Kosher relocated from its original location at Van Horne and Wiseman Avenue to the Cavendish Mall in Cote St. Luc, Quebec.

In 1996, the Van Horne store location was closed and all operations were transferred to the Cavendish Mall location, which was expanded to include two-floors, a full kitchen, an elevator, a smokehouse, and three coolers over 10,000 square feet.

Nemes still spends time working at J&R, as his son continues to add new items to the menu, including South African sausages, smoked meat hamburgers, and pulled beef - the kosher equivalent of pulled pork.

See also
 Kosher meat
 List of delicatessens

References

External links
 J&R Kosher
  J&R Kosher at Quartier Cavendish
  J&R Kosher on Facebook
 J&R Kosher on Twitter

1952 establishments in Quebec
Ashkenazi Jewish cuisine
Ashkenazi Jewish culture in Montreal
Jewish delicatessens in Canada
Jews and Judaism in Montreal
Montreal cuisine
Restaurants established in 1952
Restaurants in Montreal
Romanian-Canadian history
Shops in Montreal
Romanian-Jewish culture in Canada